Andrew Kerr (1878–1969) was an American football coach.

Andrew or Andy Kerr may also refer to:
Andrew Kerr (Australian politician) (1837–1907), New South Wales politician
Andrew Kerr (broadcaster), Scottish television presenter and journalist
Andrew Kerr (festival co-founder) (1933–2014), co-founder of Glastonbury Fair
Andrew Kerr (water polo) (born 1954), Australian water polo player
Andrew England Kerr (born 1958), Member of the European Parliament
Andrew Kerr (civil servant), chief executive of Wiltshire Council
Andy Kerr (Scottish politician) (born 1962), Labour politician and former Member of the Scottish Parliament
Andy Kerr (footballer, born 1931) (1931–1997), Scottish footballer
Andy Kerr (footballer, born 1966), English footballer
Andy Kerr (American politician) (born 1968), American politician from Colorado
Andy Kerr (musician), Canadian musician
Andy Kerr (weightlifter), English weightlifter who competed for England
Andy Kerr (environmentalist) (born 1955), conservation advocate and writer

See also
Andrew Ker (born 1954), Scottish rugby union player and cricketer
Andy Kerr Stadium, a stadium named for the football coach